The 1995 Holy Cross Crusaders football team was an American football team that represented the College of the Holy Cross during the 1995 NCAA Division I-AA football season. Holy Cross finished fifth in the Patriot League.

In their fourth and final year under head coach Peter Vaas, the Crusaders compiled a 2–9 record. David Harris, Matt Faery and Brian Regan were the team captains.

The Crusaders were outscored 326 to 180. Holy Cross' 1–4 conference record placed fifth in the six-team Patriot League standings. This was the Crusaders' worst result in 10 years of league play.

Holy Cross played its home games at Fitton Field on the college campus in Worcester, Massachusetts.

Schedule

References

Holy Cross
Holy Cross Crusaders football seasons
Holy Cross Crusaders football